Eslabon Armado is an American regional Mexican group formed in 2017. The group consists of Pedro Tovar (lead vocals), Brian Tovar (bass), Damian Pacheco (requinto guitar) and Ulises González (acoustic guitar). They have released five studio albums and have received several awards and nominations including two Billboard Music Awards, two Billboard Latin Music Awards and two Latin American Music Awards.

Career
The group started as a trio in 2017, composed of brothers Pedro Tovar and Brian Tovar, alongside their friend Gabriel Hidalgo, all three being still teenagers, the three began to study and play Sierreña music as well as Regional Mexican genres like norteño and ranchera, influenced by the music listened by their parents, the trio released several videos of live performances to YouTube and other social media platforms like TikTok, gaining attention from record labels. The trio was later discovered by Ángel del Villar and signed to DEL Records.

In 2020, they released their first singles "Con Tus Besos" and "La Trokita", both songs entered the Hot Latin Songs chart, peaking at numbers 15 and 37, respectively. Their debut album Tu Veneno Mortal was released on April 6, 2020. During 2020, the trio released two more albums, Vibras de Noche on July 17 and Corta Venas on December 18. All three albums topped the Regional Mexican Albums chart while the first two were certified platinum in United States. Following the release of the albums, Gabriel Hidalgo left the group.

Their fourth album Tu Veneno Mortal, Vol. 2 was released on June 25, 2021. In September 2021, Ulises González joined the group, making them a trio again. Also in 2021, they released"Jugaste y Sufrí", a collaboration with DannyLux, the song was highly successful peaking at number 69 at the Billboard Hot 100 chart, being their only appearance in the chart to date. At the 2021 Billboard Latin Music Awards, the trio won Duo/Group Top Latin Albums Artist of the Year and Regional Mexican Album of the Year, the latter for Tu Veneno Mortal, while at the Latin American Music Awards of 2021, they won Favorite Duo or Group and Favorite Regional Mexican Duo or Group.

In early 2022, Damian Pacheco joined the group. On May 5, 2022, the group released NOSTALGIA, the album was their fifth consecutive number one at the Regional Mexican Albums chart, additionally, the album peaked at number 9 at the Billboard 200 chart, becoming the first Regional Mexican album to achieve a top 10 position in the chart.

Members
Current members
 Pedro Tovar – lead vocals, requinto guitar (2017–present)
 Brian Tovar – bass (2017–present)
 Ulises González – acoustic guitar (2021–present)
 Damian Pacheco – requinto guitar (2022–present)

Past members
 Gabriel Hidalgo – guitar, backing vocals (2017-2020)

Discography

Studio albums

Singles

Other charted songs

Awards and nominations

Footnotes

References

Regional Mexican musicians
Regional Mexican music groups